The following is a list of libraries in state of Oregon.

Public libraries
A complete list of all public libraries in Oregon. This excludes library districts.
Adams Public Library, Adams
Albany Public Library (Oregon), Albany
Aloha Community Library, Aloha
Amity Public Library, Amity
Arlington Public Library (Oregon), Arlington
Astoria Public Library, Astoria
Athena Public Library, Athena
Baker County Public Library, Baker City
Bandon Public Library, Bandon 
Banks Public Library, Banks
Bethany-Cedar Mill Library, Washington County
Beaverton City Library, Beaverton
Beaverton-Murray Scholls Library, Beaverton
Brownsville Community Library, Brownsville
Cedar Mill Community Library, Washington County
Chetco Community Public Library, Brookings
Harney County Library, Burns
Canby Public Library, Canby
Gilliam County Library, Condon
Coos Bay Public Library, Coos Bay
Coquille Public Library, Coquille
Cornelius Public Library, Cornelius 
Corvallis-Benton County Public Library, Corvallis
Cottage Grove Library, Cottage Grove
Dallas Public Library, Dallas
Mary Gilkey Library, Dayton
Deschutes Public Library (Oregon), Bend
Dufur Community Library, Dufur 
Echo Public Library, Echo
Elgin Public Library, Elgin
Enterprise Public Library, Enterprise
Estacada Public Library, Estacada  
Eugene Public Library, Eugene
Fairview-Columbia Library, Fairview
Wagner Community Library, Falls City
Forest Grove City Library, Forest Grove
Fossil Public Library, Fossil
Garden Home Community Library, Garden Home
Gladstone Public Library, Gladstone
Josephine County Library, Grants Pass
Gresham Library, Gresham
Rockwood Library, Gresham
Harrisburg Public Library, Harrisburg 
Helix Public Library, Helix
Hermiston Public Library, Hermiston
Hillsboro Public Library, Hillsboro
Hillsboro Public Library, Shute Park Branch, Hillsboro
Tuality Health Education Center, Hillsboro
Independence Public Library (Oregon), Independence
Jefferson Public Library, Jefferson
Grant County Library, John Day 
Joseph City Library, Joseph
Junction City Public Library, Junction City
Klamath County Library, Klamath Falls 
Cook Memorial Library, La Grande
Lake Oswego Public Library, Lake Oswego  
Lakeside Public Library, Lakeside
Lake County Library, Lakeview
Langlois District Library, Langlois
Lebanon Public Library, Lebanon
Driftwood Public Library, Lincoln City
Lowell Public Library, Lowell
Lyons Public Library, Lyons
Jefferson County Library, Madras  
Southern Wasco County Library, Maupin
McMinnville Public Library, McMinnville
Milton-Freewater Public Library, Milton-Freewater 
Ledding Library, Milwaukie
Molalla Public Library, Molalla 
Monmouth Public Library, Monmouth
Sherman County Public Library, Moro
Mt. Angel Public Library, Mount Angel
Dora Public Library, Myrtle Point 
Flora M Laird Memorial Library, Myrtle Point  
Newberg Public Library, Newberg
Newport Public Library, Newport 
North Bend Public Library, North Bend 
North Plains Public Library, North Plains
North Powder Public Library, North Powder
Nyssa Public Library, Nyssa
Pendleton Public Library, Pendleton
Pilot Rock Public Library, Pilot Rock
Port Orford District Library, Port Orford
Hazel M. Lewis Library, Powers
Crook County Library, Prineville
Oakridge Public Library, Oakridge
Ontario Community Library, Ontario  
Oregon City Public Library, Oregon City 
Rainier City Library, Rainier
Douglas County Library, Roseburg
St. Helens Public Library, St. Helens
Salem Public Library, Salem
Sandy Public Library, Sandy 
Scappoose Public Library, Scappoose
Scio Public Library, Scio
Seaside Public Library, Seaside 
Sheridan Public Library, Sheridan
Sherwood Public Library, Sherwood
Spray Public Library, Spray
Springfield Public Library, Springfield 
Stanfield Public Library, Stanfield 
Stayton Public Library, Stayton
Clackamas County Library, Sunnyside
Sweet Home Public Library, Sweet Home 
The Dalles-Wasco County Library, The Dalles
Tigard Public Library, Tigard 
Tillamook County Library, Tillamook 
Toledo Public Library, Toledo
Troutdale Library, Troutdale 
Tualatin Public Library, Tualatin 
Ukiah Public Library, Ukiah
Umatilla Public Library, Umatilla
Union Carnegie Public Library, Union
Emma Humphrey Library, Vale
Vernonia Public Library, Vernonia
Waldport Public Library, Waldport
Wallowa Public Library, Wallowa
Warrenton Community Library, Warrenton
West Linn Public Library, West Linn
West Slope Community Library, Washington County
Weston Public Library, Weston
Willamina Public Library, Willamina
Wilsonville Public Library, Wilsonville
Woodburn Public Library, Woodburn
Yachats Public Library, Yachats

Portland
Albina Library
Belmont Library
Capitol Hill Library
Central Library
Fairview-Columbia Library
Gregory Heights Library
Gresham Library
Hillsdale Library
Holgate Library
Hollywood Library
Kenton Library
Midland Library
North Portland Library
Northwest Library
Rockwood Library
Sellwood-Moreland Library
St. Johns Library
Troutdale Library
Woodstock Library

as of June 2018.

Academic libraries

Hannon Library, Southern Oregon University, Ashland
CCC Library, Clackamas Community College, Clackamas
The Valley Library, Oregon State University, Corvallis
Knight Library, University of Oregon, Eugene
Pierce Library, Eastern Oregon University, La Grande
Hamersly Library, Western Oregon University, Monmouth
FWJ Sylwester Library, Concordia University, Portland
Aubrey R. Watzek Library, Lewis & Clark College, Portland
Branford Price Millar Library, Portland State University, Portland
Reed College Library, Reed College, Portland
Albert Solheim Library, Pacific Northwest College of Art, Portland
Clark Library, University of Portland, Portland
Mark O. Hatfield Library, Willamette University, Salem

Others
State of Oregon Law Library, Salem

See also
List of Carnegie libraries in Oregon
Library Information Network of Clackamas County
 Books in the United States

References

Oregon

Libraries in Oregon
Libraries in Oregon